The 2015 Israel Super Cup was the 20th Israel Super Cup (25th, including unofficial matches, as the competition wasn't played within the Israel Football Association in its first 5 editions, until 1969), an annual Israel football match played between the winners of the previous season's Top Division and Israel State Cup. This was the first time since 1990 that the match was staged, after a planned resumption of the cup was cancelled in 2014.

The game was played between Maccabi Tel Aviv, champions of the 2014–15 Israeli Premier League and Ironi Kiryat Shmona, runners-up in the league, as Maccabi Tel Aviv won the State Cup final.

This was Maccabi Tel Aviv's fifth Israel Super Cup appearance (7th, including unofficial matches) and Kiryat Shmona's first. Watched by a crowd of 7,000 at Netanya Stadium, Ironi Kiryat Shmona won the match 5–4 on penalties, after a 2–2 draw in extra time.

Match details

References

2015
Super Cup
Super Cup 2015
Super Cup 2015
Israel Super Cup matches
Israel Super Cup 2015